Gino Rozzini (October 24, 1916 — April 18, 1996) was a Canadian professional ice hockey player who played 31 games in the National Hockey League with the Boston Bruins during the 1944–45 season. The rest of his career, which lasted from 1940 to 1959, was spent in various minor leagues.

Rozzini scored his first NHL goal on November 12, 1944 in Boston's 5-5 tie versus the New York Rangers at Madison Square Garden.

Career statistics

Regular season and playoffs

External links

1916 births
1996 deaths
Boston Bruins players
Boston Olympics players
Canadian expatriate ice hockey players in the United States
Canadian ice hockey centres
Hershey Bears players
Ice hockey people from Quebec
New Haven Ramblers players
Ontario Hockey Association Senior A League (1890–1979) players
Quebec Aces (QSHL) players
Spokane Flyers players
Sportspeople from Shawinigan
St. Paul Saints (USHL) players
Tacoma Rockets (WHL) players
Tulsa Oilers (USHL) players
Vancouver Canucks (WHL) players
Western International Hockey League players